Northeastern State University (NSU) is a public university with its main campus in Tahlequah, Oklahoma. The university also has two other campuses in Muskogee and Broken Arrow as well as online. Northeastern is the oldest institution of higher learning in the state of Oklahoma as well as one of the oldest institutions of higher learning west of the Mississippi River. Tahlequah is home to the capital of the Cherokee Nation of Oklahoma and about 25 percent of the students at NSU identify themselves as American Indian. The university has many courses focused on Native American linguistics, and offers Cherokee language Education as a major. Cherokee can be studied as a second language, and some classes are taught in Cherokee for first language speakers as well.

History
On May 7, 1851, the Cherokee Nation founded the Cherokee National Female Seminary at Tahlequah, the same year that it opened a male seminary in its territory. This was after its removal to Indian Territory and part of its building institutions to support its future.

On March 6, 1909, after statehood, the State Legislature of Oklahoma passed an act providing for the creation and location of Northeastern State Normal School at Tahlequah, Oklahoma for the training of teachers. For this purpose, it purchased from the Cherokee Tribal Government the building, land, and equipment of the Cherokee Female Seminary.

In 1921, the name was changed to Northeastern State Teachers College as it had expanded to a full four-year curriculum. In the 1950s Northeastern emerged as a comprehensive state college, broadening its curriculum at the baccalaureate level to encompass liberal arts subjects and adding a fifth-year program designed to prepare master teachers for elementary and secondary schools.

With addition of graduate-degree programs, in 1974, the Oklahoma Legislature authorized changing the name of the institution from Northeastern State College to Northeastern Oklahoma State University; in 1985 it authorized a change in name to Northeastern State University.  In 1979, NSU opened its College of Optometry, making it one of 14 schools in the United States to offer a doctorate degree in that field.

In the early 21st century, NSU is the fourth-largest university in Oklahoma.  On March 6, 2009, NSU celebrated its centennial with Founders Day celebrations.

Presidents

Albert Sydney Wyly, 1909
Frank Redd, 1909–1911
Frank E. Buck, 1911–1912
W.E. Gill, 1912–1914
George W. Gable, 1914–1919
William T. Ford, 1919–1923
Monroe P. Hammond, 1923–1935
J.M. Hackler (Acting), 1935–1936
John Samuel Vaughan, 1936–1951
Louis H. Bally (Acting), 1951
Harrell E. Garrison, 1951–1970
Robert E. Collier, 1970–1977
Elwin Fite (Acting), 1977–1978
W. Roger Webb, 1978–1997
Larry B. Williams, 1997–2007
Kim Cherry (Interim), 2007–2008
Don Betz, 2008–2011
Martin Tadlock (Interim), 2011
Steve Turner, 2012–present

Tahlequah Campus
The original building for the seminary is now used as Seminary Hall, an academic building. The campus has numerous classroom, laboratory, residential, and athletic facilities. In recent years the university constructed a $10 million Science Center, funded by a bond issued by the university.

NSU offers 69 undergraduate degrees, 18 graduate degrees and 13 pre-professional programs in five colleges (Business & Technology, Liberal Arts, Education, Optometry, and Health & Science Professions). The student-to-faculty ratio is 26 to 1, and in the Spring of 2008 the total enrollment for the Tahlequah Campus was 6,216. There is also a distance-learning program, by which students who cannot attend the university due to work or family obligations can complete courses via the Internet or videoconferencing.

Academic buildings
The academic buildings are located throughout the campus. The buildings are:
Seminary Hall
The Science Center
The Business and Technology Building (formerly Practical Arts Building)
The Fine Arts Building
The W. Roger Webb Educational Technology Center (formerly NET Lab)
Bagley Hall (Education Building)
John Vaughan Library
The CASE Building (Center for Admissions and Student Enrollment)

Residential buildings
Northeastern has nine residence halls. They are the following:
Haskell Hall (Closed; Repurposed)
Hastings Hall (closed)
Isabel Cobb Hall
Logan Hall (closed)
North Leoser complex
North wing
Northeast wing
Northwest wing
South Leoser complex
South wing
Southeast wing
Southwest wing
Ross Hall (closed)
Seminary Suites
Wyly Hall

Athletics

The Northeastern State (NSU) athletic teams are called the RiverHawks. The university is a member of the Division II level of the National Collegiate Athletic Association (NCAA), primarily competing in the Mid-America Intercollegiate Athletics Association (MIAA) for most of its sports since the 2012–13 academic year; while its men's soccer team competes in the Great American Conference (GAC). The RiverHawks previously competed as an NCAA D-II Independent during the 2011–12 school year; in the D-II Lone Star Conference (LSC) from 1997–98 to 2010–11; and in the Oklahoma Intercollegiate Conference (OIC) of the National Association of Intercollegiate Athletics (NAIA) from 1974–75 to 1996–97.

NSU competes in 11 intercollegiate sports sports: Men's sports include baseball, basketball, football, golf and soccer; while women's sports include basketball, golf, soccer, softball, spirit squads and tennis.

Accomplishments
In 2003, the men's basketball team won the NCAA Division II National Championship, beating Kentucky Wesleyan 75–64.

Name change
Northeastern State University announced on May 23, 2006, that they would be dropping "Redmen" and selecting a new mascot. The change was made proactively in response to the 2005 NCAA Native American mascot decision. The university announced its new athletic name as the RiverHawks on November 14, 2006.

Campus life

Campus organizations
There are several campus organizations such as NAB (Northeastern Activities Board), NSUSF (Northeastern State University Student Foundation), and NSGA (Northeastern Student Government Association) that provide alternate activities, usually free of charge for students to enjoy on campus. The NSGA is the official organization to represent the students of NSU.  The purpose of the NSGA is to establish a representative student government and to provide a forum for student's views and ideas for the purpose of promoting and representing the students of NSU.  RHA caters to on-campus residents and hosts such annual events as "Welcome Week Luau," Freshman Move-in Day, Mardi Gras, and "Resident Round-up". Northeastern State University also has several fraternities and sororities located on the Tahlequah campus.

Greek life
 Honor Society
Rho Theta Sigma est. 1920's

Fraternities

Interfraternity
 Phi Sigma Kappa est. 1910
 Phi Lambda Chi est. 1939
 Pi Kappa Alpha est. 1975
 Tau Kappa Epsilon est. 1989
 Kappa Sigma est. 1993
 Sigma Tau Gamma Original charter October 5, 1924, Reestablished 11/2018

Multicultural
 Kappa Alpha Psi
 Phi Sigma Nu

Sororities

Panhellenic
 Delta Zeta 1923, recolonized 1956
 Sigma Sigma Sigma 1929
 Alpha Omicron Pi 1997

Multicultural
 Alpha Pi Omega 2006
 Delta Sigma Theta, recolonized 2009

Christian
Kappa Phi
Chi Alpha

Jazz Lab
Created in 1993, the Jazz Lab building serves as a place where jazz musicians can practice performing and listeners can enjoy live music. In addition to a performance venue, the Jazz Lab is also the site of the jazz program offices and classes. The university offers a Bachelor of Arts in Music with a major in Jazz Studies and has two student jazz ensembles, as well as several different combo groups ranging in style from fusion to Latin to straight ahead. The NSU Jazz Ensemble performs with regional, national, and international guest artists at the Jazz Lab every year. Many famous musicians have performed at the Jazz Lab since its creation, including T.S. Monk, Henry Johnson, Diana Krall, Mulgrew Miller, Bobby Watson, Bob Mintzer, Slide Hampton, Robin Eubanks, Wynton Marsalis, and Bobby Shew.

Branch campuses

Muskogee 
The campus offers upper-level and graduate courses in education, business, general studies, nursing, and industrial management. In 2001 the NSU Muskogee opened the Mike Synar Center in honor of Mike Synar, former U.S. Congressman from the 2nd District of Oklahoma from 1979 to 1995. The Mike Synar Center is a  facility that is used for offices and classrooms. The center also houses the Master of Business Administration and the Bachelor of Science in Nursing program for the campus.

Broken Arrow 
NSU's Broken Arrow campus was opened in 2002 with a little over 1,000 students.  Funding for the campus came from a one-half percent sales tax which was approved by Broken Arrow voters. The first phase of the campus included an administration building, a maintenance facility, and two classroom buildings. In 2004 the campus began a $26 million expansion made possible by Tulsa County's Vision 2025, which also funded Tulsa's new BOK Center. The expansion doubled the size of the campus and also allowed room for up to another 5,000 students. It also added a library along with science and classroom buildings. Construction was completed in the fall of 2007.

Notable alumni

References

External links

 
 Northeastern State athletics website
 

 
Public universities and colleges in Oklahoma
Educational institutions established in 1851
Education in Cherokee County, Oklahoma
Buildings and structures in Tahlequah, Oklahoma
Education in Muskogee County, Oklahoma
Education in Tulsa County, Oklahoma
Optometry schools in the United States
Cherokee language
1909 establishments in Oklahoma
1851 establishments in Indian Territory